This is a historical list of all bishops of the Catholic Church whose sees were within the present-day boundaries of the Philippines, with links to the bishops who consecrated them. The list covers from the establishment of the Diocese of Manila in 1579 up until the present.

The list is arranged according to the date of their consecration/ordination to the episcopate. For cases of bishops who governed a foreign diocese before their assignment to the Philippines, they are arranged according to the date when they are transferred to a diocese within the country, with the date of their consecration in parenthesis. Non-numbered names are priests who were appointed as bishop but were not able to receive episcopal consecration due to certain reasons, however they are considered as part of the episcopal list of their respective dioceses by virtue of their appointment. "Diocese" refers to the diocese over which the bishop presided or, if he did not preside, the diocese in which he served as coadjutor bishop or auxiliary bishop. The Roman numeral before the diocese name represents where in the sequence that bishop falls; e.g., the fourth bishop of Manila is written "IV Manila". Where a diocese is in bold type it indicates that the bishop is the current bishop of that diocese. Titular sees are not listed. Under consecrators are the numbers (or letters) referencing previous bishops on the list. The number listed first represents the principal consecrator. If a series of letters is under "Consecrators", then the consecrators were bishops from outside the Philippines (the list of foreign sees is at the bottom of the page). Where the letter "F" is used, it indicates that a priest who was not a bishop assisted in the consecration.

Chart of episcopal succession

Spanish era (1581-1898)

American era and World War II (1898-1946)

Post-colonial Period (1946)

Second Vatican Council and aftermath (1963)

Third Millennium (2000-present)

Abbreviations and notes

Foreign consecrators

Other abbreviations 

 F=Priest who was not a bishop
 F(#)=Priest who was not a bishop but was consecrated bishop later
 PP=Pope

Notes

References 

 
 ABELLA, D. (1959). Episcopal Succession in the Philippines. Philippine Studies, 7(4), 435–447. http://www.jstor.org/stable/42719470
 ABELLA, D. (1960). The Succession of Bishops of Cebu. Philippine Studies, 8(3), 535–543. http://www.jstor.org/stable/42719582
 ABELLA, D. (1962). The Bishops of Nueva Segobia. Philippine Studies, 10(4), 577–585. http://www.jstor.org/stable/42719799
 ABELLA, D. (1963). The Bishops of Cáceres and Jaro. Philippine Studies, 11(4), 548–556. http://www.jstor.org/stable/42718959

See also 
 Historical list of the Catholic bishops of the United States
 List of Catholic bishops in the Philippines

Philippines
Roman Catholic bishops in the Philippines
bishops
Bishops